Jordi Rubió i Balaguer (Barcelona, 1887 – Barcelona, 1982) was a Catalan philologist and librarian.

Some works 
 La lògica en rims del Gazzali glosada en rims per Ramon Llull (1914)
 De l'Edat mitjana al Renaixement: Figures literàries de Catalunya i València (1948)
 Obres essencials de Ramon Llull (1957-1960)
 La cultura catalana del Renaixement a la Decadència (1964), recull d'articles 
 Documentos para la Historia de la Universidad de Barcelona. I. Preliminares (1289-1451)
 Il·lustració i Renaixença (1987)
 Llibreters i impressors a la Corona d'Aragó (1994)

1887 births
1982 deaths
Spanish librarians
Premi d'Honor de les Lletres Catalanes winners
Members of the Institute for Catalan Studies